Kondor (also Romanized as Kondar and Kundar) is a village in Adaran Rural District, of Asara District, Karaj County, Alborz province, Iran. At the 2006 census, its population was 1,498 in 429 households. At the most recent census of 2016, the population had increased to 1,922 people in 675 households; it was the largest village in its rural district.

References 

Populated places in Alborz Province

Populated places in Karaj County